The Mason House was a historic house on West Main Street in Bradford, Arkansas.  It was a single story wood-frame structure, with a front-facing gabled roof, weatherboard siding, and a concrete foundation.  A flat-roof porch extended across the front and around part of one side, supported by round columns.  Built in 1935, it was Bradford's best example of vernacular Craftsman architecture.

The house was listed on the National Register of Historic Places in 1992.  It has been listed as destroyed in the Arkansas Historic Preservation Program database.

See also
National Register of Historic Places listings in White County, Arkansas

References

Houses on the National Register of Historic Places in Arkansas
Houses completed in 1935
Houses in White County, Arkansas
Demolished buildings and structures in Arkansas
National Register of Historic Places in White County, Arkansas
1935 establishments in Arkansas
Bungalow architecture in Arkansas
American Craftsman architecture in Arkansas